The Pocomoke City Historic District is a national historic district in Pocomoke City, Worcester County, Maryland.  The historic district includes the central business district (CBD) and surrounding residential area of Pocomoke City. The CBD is defined by an important collection of late-19th century and early-20th century commercial and public architecture.  It includes a significant array of Victorian, Colonial Revival, and Beaux-Arts influenced structures.    The majority of the housing dates from 1870 to 1940.  It is an example of a type of prosperous river town that characterized the region during the period, which retains an exceptional collection of 19th and 20th century building forms.

It was added to the National Register of Historic Places in 2004.

References

External links

, including photo dated 2002, at Maryland Historical Trust
Boundary Map of the Pocomoke City Historic District, Worcester County, at Maryland Historical Trust

Historic districts in Worcester County, Maryland
Historic districts on the National Register of Historic Places in Maryland
Beaux-Arts architecture in Maryland
Colonial Revival architecture in Maryland
Victorian architecture in Maryland
Federal architecture in Maryland
Pocomoke City, Maryland
National Register of Historic Places in Worcester County, Maryland